The 2015–16 Turkish Cup is the 54th season of the Turkish Cup. Ziraat Bankası is the sponsor of the tournament, thus the sponsored name is Ziraat Turkish Cup. The winners will earn a berth in the group stage of the 2016–17 UEFA Europa League, and also qualify for the 2016 Turkish Super Cup.

Competition format

Preliminary round
 30 teams from Regional Amateur League competed in this round.
 15 teams (50%) from Regional Amateur League qualified for the next round.
 9 seeded (60%) and 6 unseeded (40%) teams qualified for the next round.

First round
 57 teams from Third League and 15 teams from Regional Amateur League competed in this round.
 30 teams (53%) from Third League and 6 teams (40%) from Regional Amateur League qualified for the next round.
 17 seeded (47%) and 19 unseeded (53%) teams qualified for the next round.

Second round
 8 teams from Super League, 18 teams from First League, 36 teams from Second League, 30 teams from Third League and 6 teams from Regional Amateur League competed in this round.
 7 teams (88%) from Super League, 12 teams (67%) from First League, 18 teams (50%) from Second League, 10 teams (33%) from Third League and 2 teams (33%) from Regional Amateur League qualified for the next round.
 34 seeded (69%) and 15 unseeded (31%) teams qualified for the next round.

Third round
 12 teams from Super League, 12 teams from First League, 18 teams from Second League, 10 teams from Third League and 2 teams from Regional Amateur League will compete in this round.
 9 teams (75%) from Super League, 7 teams (47%) from First League, 9 teams (50%) from Second League and 2 teams (20%) from Third League qualified for the next round. None of teams from Regional Amateur League was qualified.
 17 seeded (59%) and 10 unseeded (41%) teams qualified for the next round.

Group stage
Top five teams from 2014–15 Süper Lig joined 27 winners from the third round for the group stage. The group draw will commence on 7 December 2015, as 32 teams were split into 8 groups of 4 teams. This stage is a round-robin tournament with home and away matches, in the vein of UEFA European competitions' group stages. The winners and runners-up of the eight groups will advance to the round of 16.

Group A

Group B

Group C

Group D

Group E

Group F

Group G

Group H

Knockout stage

Active teams shown in bold.

Bracket

Round of 16

Summary table

|-

|}

Matches

Quarter-finals

Summary table

|-

|}

First leg

Second leg

Semi-finals

Summary table

|-

|}

First leg

Second leg

Final
The final was contested in Antalya as a one-off match. The winning club, Galatasaray, was awarded 50 medals club along with the Turkish Cup trophy.

References

External links 

2015-16
2015–16 European domestic association football cups
Cup